Club Social Deportivo Ferrocarril (sometimes referred as Ferrocarril) is a Peruvian football club, playing in the city of Zarumilla, Tumbes, Peru.

History
The Club Social Deportivo Ferrocarril was founded on February 12, 1950.

In 1970 Copa Perú, the club classified to the Regional Stage, but was eliminated by Atlético Torino and Unión Tumán.

In 2014 Copa Perú, the club classified to the Provincial Stage, but was eliminated by Sport Unión and Sport Municipal.

In 2016 Copa Perú, the club classified to the Provincial Stage, but was eliminated by Comercial Aguas Verdes.

In 2018 Copa Perú, the club classified to the National Stage, but was eliminated when finished in 33rd place.

Honours

Regional
Liga Departamental de Tumbes:
Winners (3): 1969, 2018, 2022
Runner-up (2): 1966, 1970

Liga Provincial de Zarumilla:
Winners (2): 2018, 2022

Liga Superior de Tumbes:
Runner-up (1): 2019

Liga Distrital de Zarumilla:
Winners (7): 1966, 1969, 1970, 1992, 2014, 2018, 2022
Runner-up (1): 2016

See also
List of football clubs in Peru
Peruvian football league system

References

External links
 

Football clubs in Peru
Association football clubs established in 1950
1950 establishments in Peru